Jake Gyllenhaal is an American actor and producer who has received various awards and nominations, including a British Academy Film Award for playing Jack Twist in Ang Lee's romance Brokeback Mountain (2005). He has received additional nominations for one Academy Award, two British Academy Film Awards, two Golden Globe Awards, and three Tony Awards.

After making his acting debut in City Slickers (1991), Gyllenhaal's first nominations were for October Sky (1999), an American biographical film about NASA engineer Homer Hickam. His performance as the title character in the 2001 psychological thriller film Donnie Darko earned him a Young Hollywood Award and a nomination for the Independent Spirit Award for Best Male Lead. Gyllenhaal's role opposite Heath Ledger in Brokeback Mountain received critical acclaim. In addition to receiving the BAFTA Award for Best Actor in a Supporting Role and the MTV Movie Award for Best Performance, he was nominated in the Best Supporting Actor category at the 78th Academy Awards, the 11th Critics' Choice Awards, the 10th Satellite Awards, and the 12th Screen Actors Guild Awards. In 2010, he starred in the romantic comedy-drama film Love & Other Drugs, leading to Best Actor nominations at the 68th Golden Globe Awards and the 15th Satellite Awards.

Gyllenhaal received numerous accolades for his performance in Nightcrawler (2014), in which he plays a stringer who records violent late-night events and sells the footage to the media. He was awarded Best Actor by several regional film critics associations and was nominated in the Best Actor category at the 68th British Academy Film Awards, the 20th Critics' Choice Awards, the 72nd Golden Globe Awards, and the 21st Screen Actors Guild Awards. In 2016, he starred in Nocturnal Animals, receiving another nomination for the BAFTA Award for Best Actor in a Leading Role. Gyllenhaal's portrayal of Boston Marathon bombing survivor Jeff Bauman in Stronger (2017) earned him the Hollywood Actor Award at the Hollywood Film Awards, as well as Best Actor nominations at the 23rd Critics' Choice Awards and the 22nd Satellite Awards.

Gyllenhaal's theatrical debut was in Kenneth Lonergan's London revival of This Is Our Youth in 2002, for which he won the Evening Standard Theatre Award for Outstanding Newcomer. For his performance in the Broadway play Sea Wall/A Life, he was nominated for Best Actor in a Leading Role in a Play at the 74th Tony Awards.

Awards and nominations

Notes

References

External links
 

Lists of awards received by American actor